The 2003 Major League Baseball postseason was the playoff tournament of Major League Baseball for the 2003 season. The winners of the League Division Series would move on to the League Championship Series to determine the pennant winners that face each other in the World Series. This was the first edition of the postseason where home-field advantage in the World Series was awarded to the league who won the MLB All-Star Game, a rule which lasted until 2016.

In the American League, the New York Yankees made their ninth straight postseason appearance, the Oakland Athletics made their fourth straight appearance, the Minnesota Twins made their second straight appearance, and the Boston Red Sox made their first postseason appearance of the new Millennium.

In the National League, the Atlanta Braves made their twelfth consecutive appearance in the postseason, the Florida Marlins and Chicago Cubs made their first postseason appearance of the new Millennium, and the San Francisco Giants returned for the third time in four years. 

The postseason began on September 30, 2003, and ended on October 25, 2003, with the Marlins defeating the Yankees in six games in the 2003 World Series. It was the Marlins' second title in franchise history.

Playoff seeds
The following teams qualified for the postseason:

American League
 New York Yankees - 101–61, Clinched AL East
 Oakland Athletics - 96–66, Clinched AL West
 Minnesota Twins - 90–72, Clinched AL Central
 Boston Red Sox - 95–67, Clinched Wild Card

National League
 Atlanta Braves - 101–61, Clinched NL East
 San Francisco Giants - 100–61, Clinched NL West
 Chicago Cubs - 88–74, Clinched NL Central
 Florida Marlins - 91–71, Clinched Wild Card

Playoff bracket

Note: Two teams in the same division could not meet in the division series.

American League Division Series

(1) New York Yankees vs. (3) Minnesota Twins 

This was the first postseason meeting between the Yankees and Twins. The Yankees defeated the Twins in four games to return to the ALCS for the seventh time in eight years. Both teams would meet again in the ALDS in 2004, 2009, 2010, and 2019, as well as the 2017 AL Wild Card Game, which were all won by the Yankees.

(2) Oakland Athletics vs. (4) Boston Red Sox 

This was the fourth postseason meeting between the Athletics and Red Sox, dating back to 1975 when they first met. The Red Sox rallied from a two games to none series deficit to defeat the Athletics and advance to the ALCS for the first time since 1999. With the victory by the Red Sox, the playoff history between these two teams is tied at 2 series wins each.

National League Division Series

(1) Atlanta Braves vs. (3) Chicago Cubs 

This was the first postseason meeting between the Cubs and Braves since 1998. The Cubs defeated the Braves in five games to advance to the NLCS for the first time since 1989. It was the first playoff series won by the Cubs since the 1908 World Series.

The Braves would return to the postseason the next two seasons, but fell to the Houston Astros both times in the NLDS.

(2) San Francisco Giants vs. (4) Florida Marlins 

This was the first postseason meeting between the Marlins and Giants since 1997. The Marlins defeated the defending National League champion Giants, this time in four games, to advance to the NLCS for the first time since 1997. While the Giants won Game 1 at home, the Marlins took Game 2 to even the series headed to Miami. The Marlins narrowly took Game 3 after 11 innings, and prevailed by one run again in Game 4 to advance.

The Giants would not return to the postseason again until 2010.

American League Championship Series

(1) New York Yankees vs. (4) Boston Red Sox 

This was the second postseason series in the history of the Yankees-Red Sox rivalry. In a tightly contested seven game series, the Yankees prevailed again, this time in seven games, to return to the World Series for the sixth time in eight years.  

In the Bronx, the first two games were split by both teams. In Boston for Game 3, the series was marred by a bench-clearing brawl, where Manny Ramírez took exception to a high pitch by Roger Clemens and charged the mound. Both benches cleared, and the brawl turned surreal when 72-year-old Yankee bench coach Don Zimmer charged Pedro Martínez. Martínez sidestepped Zimmer, placed his hands on Zimmer's head and propelled Zimmer to the ground. The Zimmer/Martinez altercation ended there as Yankee trainer Gene Monahan and various Yankee players attended to him. The Yankees narrowly held on by a 4-3 score to take a 2-1 series lead. The Red Sox would win Game 4, while the Yankees took Game 5 to go up 3-2 in the series headed back to New York. The Red Sox won a high-scoring Game 6 to force a seventh game. In Game 7, the Red Sox held a 5-2 lead going into the bottom of the eighth inning, however Boston manager Grady Little made a surprising move and decided not to pull starting pitcher Pedro Martinez. This decision proved to be disastrous for the Red Sox, as the Yankees would score three runs in the bottom of the eighth to tie the game at five runs each. The game lasted another two innings until the Yankees prevailed in the bottom of the 11th inning thanks to a walk-off solo home run by Aaron Boone in the 11th inning of Game 7.

This was the last time the Yankees won the AL pennant until 2009, where they defeated the Los Angeles Angels of Anaheim in six games en route to a World Series title. The Red Sox would get revenge the next year, by overcoming a 3-0 series deficit to defeat the Yankees in seven games and win the World Series, ending the Curse of the Bambino.

National League Championship Series

(3) Chicago Cubs vs. (4) Florida Marlins 

This was the first postseason meeting between the Marlins and Cubs. The Marlins overcame a 3-1 series deficit to win the series in seven games and advance to the World Series for the first time since 1997. Like the ALCS, this NLCS was also marred by controversy, more specifically Game 6, which is where the Steve Bartman incident unfolded. On the eighth pitch of his at bat, Luis Castillo hit a high foul ball toward the left field wall. Cubs left fielder Moisés Alou (a former Marlin) headed toward the stands to catch the ball for the potential second out. As Alou reached for the ball, Cubs fan Steve Bartman, along with others near the area, did the same. The ball bounced off Bartman's hands and into the stands. Though the Cubs pleaded for a call of fan interference, left field umpire Mike Everitt ruled that the ball had left the field of play and was therefore up for grabs. Alou, who was visibly angry at Bartman's catch, initially acknowledged that he would not have made the catch, but he later denied making such a statement and said if he had, it was only to make Bartman feel better.

As a result, Castillo remained an active batter at home plate. On the next pitch, Prior walked Castillo with a wild pitch that got away from catcher Paul Bako, also allowing Pierre to advance to third base.

Next, Iván Rodríguez hit an 0–2 pitch hard into left field, singling and scoring Pierre. Miguel Cabrera then hit a ground ball toward Cubs shortstop Alex Gonzalez that could have ended the inning on a double play. Gonzalez, who led all NL shortstops in fielding percentage, closed his glove too early and the ball landed in the dirt, allowing Cabrera to reach safely, loading the bases. On the next pitch, Derrek Lee (a future Cubs All-Star) drilled a double into left field, scoring Castillo and Rodríguez to tie the score at 3–3.

Prior was taken out of the game and replaced by Kyle Farnsworth, who intentionally walked Mike Lowell to load the bases. Jeff Conine then hit a sacrifice fly to right field for the second out of the inning, allowing Cabrera to score from third and the other runners to each advance one base. This gave the Marlins their first lead of the night. Farnsworth intentionally walked Todd Hollandsworth (another future Cub) to once again load the bases.

The Marlins now having batted around the order, Mordecai, making up for his earlier out, hit a base-clearing double to left-center field, scoring Lee, Lowell and Hollandsworth and making it a 7–3 Marlins lead. Farnsworth was taken out of the game and replaced by Mike Remlinger, who gave up a single to Pierre to score Mordecai from second base. Castillo popped to shallow right field for the final out of an 8-run inning. The comeback victory by the Marlins forced a Game 7, which the Marlins won.

As of 2022, this is the last time the Marlins won the NL pennant. The Cubs returned to the NLCS in 2015, but were swept by the New York Mets. They would eventually redeem themselves in the 2016 NLCS, where the Cubs defeated the Los Angeles Dodgers in six games en route to a World Series title.

2003 World Series

(AL1) New York Yankees vs. (NL4) Florida Marlins 

The Yankees had been awarded home-field advantage for this World Series, because the AL won the 2003 All-Star game. MLB had alternated home-field advantage for the World Series between the two leagues prior to this, and the NL would have been due for home-field in 2003 before the change. The Marlins upset the heavily favored Yankees in six games to capture their second championship in franchise history. 

The Marlins stole Game 1 in the Bronx, handing the Yankees their first home loss in the World Series since 1996. The Yankees, thanks to an excellent pitching performance by Andy Pettitte, answered back in Game 2 to even the series. When the series moved to Miami, Mike Mussina prevailed in a pitchers' duel against Florida's Josh Beckett to win Game 3 for the Yankees and give them a 2-1 lead in the series. However, their lead would not hold. The Mariners prevailed in a 12-inning duel in Game 4 to even the series, and won Game 5 by two runs to go up 3-2 in the series headed back to the Bronx. Game 5 was the last postseason game ever played at Pro Player Stadium. In Game 6, Josh Beckett made up for the loss in Game 3 by pitching a complete game shutout for the Marlins, 2-0, to secure the title. Game 6 was the last World Series game ever played at the original Yankee Stadium.

After the series win, the Marlins entered a long slump in which they would not return to the postseason, let alone win another playoff series, until 2020. The Yankees would not return to the World Series again until 2009, where they defeated the Philadelphia Phillies in six games.

References

External links
 League Baseball Standings & Expanded Standings - 2003

 
Major League Baseball postseason